William Tilly might refer to:

 William Tilly of Selling, or William Celling (died 1494), English cleric
 William Tilly (1860–1935), Australian elocutionist—see Mid-Atlantic accent